Chamaa is a village and municipality in the Tyre District of Lebanon's South Governorate, about 25 kilometres southeast of Tyre and some 99 kilometres south of Beirut.

It is especially known for its historical castle on a strategic hill overlooking the coastal plain of Tyre and Naqoura.

The United Nations Interim Force in Lebanon (UNIFIL) Sector West headquarters, led by the contingent of the Italian army, are based on a neighbouring hill.

Name

According to E. H. Palmer, Kŭlảt Shemả, means the castle of Shemả; he suggested to link it with the Hebrew given name Shimeon.

While the transliteration of the Arabic word for castle of would more precisely be Qala'at, it has also been spelled Kalat.

Chamaa is also transliterated as Chama or Shama, and - more closely to the Arabic original pronunciation - Chama'a. It draws its name from a grave in a shrine on the main hill which is attributed by local tradition to Saint Peter, known in Arabic as Shamoun al-Safa (also transliterated Chamoun or Shimon al-Safa, from Simeon and Cephas (from the Aramaic Kepha, or rock/stone). According to this Shia belief, Saint Peter was also an ancestor to the 12th and last Shia Imam Mahdi. Hence, thousands of Shiite pilgrims visit the memorial every year.

History

Ancient Times 

The preserved remains of a Roman-Byzantine village at the close by archaeological site of Ermet Tell seem to support the local tradition which states that the hill was used as a mausoleum in the first century CE. Evidently, the hill was inhabited during the Byzantine rule over the Levant (395–640), as is obvious from a mosaic which has been discovered on the top of the hill.

With regard to its strategic location near the Ladder of Tyre and vis-à-vis the often-besieged metropolis of Tyre it is quite conceivable though that the hill had already hosted settlements in Hellenistic, Achaemenid-Persian, Neo-Babylonian, Neo-Assyrian, Egyptian, Early Phoenician, or even Pre-Historic ages.

It is unclear what happened to the settlement in Chamaa after the area was conquered by the bearers of Islam in 640. During the half a millennium of early Muslim rule the area was first governed by the Rashidun ruler Muawiyah, followed by the Umayyad Caliphate, the Abbasid Caliphate, the Ismaili Shia Fatimid Caliphate, and the Seljuk Empire.

The exact date of the construction of the Shamoun al-Safa shrine is unknown, but its minaret was reportedly built in the late 11th century, shortly before the arrival of the crusaders.

Medieval Times 

In 1116, during the aftermath of the First Crusade, a Frankish army constructed a fortress over the Byzantine site in order to block access to heavily fortified Tyre, which was the last city in the region held by Islamic rulers. It was eventually taken over by the Christian warriors in 1124, after a siege of almost six months had led to the negotiatied surrender of Tyre by the Seljuk military leader Toghtekin. The fortress of Chamaa, which was thus part of the Kingdom of Jerusalem, also became known as Scandelion Castle, named after the neighbouring coastal area of Iskandarounah which in turn was named after Alexander the Great.

It is unclear whether Chamaa Castle was - like many of Tyre's buildings - damaged in the 1202 Syria earthquake and whether it remained under the control of the Lordship of Tyre, when John of Montfort entered a treaty in 1270 with Mamluk Sultan Baibars and transferred souvereignity over some villages in the coastal plain to him. It is likewise unclear what happened to Chamaa Castle after the Crusaders surrendered Tyre in 1291 to the Mamluk Sultanate's army of Al-Ashraf Khalil, who had all fortifications of the city demolished to prevent the Franks from re-entrenching. Like Tyre, Chamaa was subsequently governed from Acre and thus became part of Palestine, but also "sank into obsurity."

Ottoman Times 

Although the Ottoman Empire conquered the Levant in 1516, Jabal Amel (modern-day South Lebanon) remained mostly untouched until the end of the 16th century. In the 1596 tax-records it was named as a village,  Sam'a, in the Ottoman nahiya (subdistrict) of  Tibnin  under Liwa of Safad, with a population of  21  households, all Muslim. The villagers paid a fixed tax rate of 25% on agricultural products, such as wheat, barley,  fruit trees,  goats and beehives, in addition to occasional revenues; a total of 1,920 akçe.

While the French historian Ernest Renan assumed that major construction of the castle took place in the 16th century, modern historiography assumes that it was not until the mid-18th century that Chamaa experienced a major revival. At that time, Sheikh Nasif al-Nassar of the Shiite Ali al-Saghir dynasty, which dominated Jabal Amel for altogether almost three centuries, established de facto autonomy over the area and the castle became the property of his family. During this early period, the citadel underwent extensive renovation and was used for military and residential purposes. It also included an olive press, whose foundations are still visible today.

This boom period ended, however, already after three decades in 1781, when Al-Nassar was killed in a power-struggle with the Ottoman governor of Sidon, Ahmad Pasha al-Jazzar, who had the Shiite population decimated in brutal purges. Thus, the Shiite autonomy in Jabal Amel ended for a quarter century. According to Arab sources, Jazzar Pasha had his senior commander Salim Pasha al-Kabir demolish Chamaa castle, like many other fortifications of Al-Nassar as well.

Barely a century later, in 1875, French explorer Victor Guérin noted:"This castle, which is said to date only from Dhaher el-A'mer, is currently in ruins. Built on a high plateau, from where we enjoy a very wide view, it is surrounded by an enclosure that flank from distance to distance semicircular towers, built, like the enclosure itself, with regular parts, but of dimensions mediocre, except for the lower course, which, arranged in an embankment, generally consist of larger blocks of ancient appearance. The interior was divided into two parts: one to the north, where the pasha resided, and the other to the south, which contained about sixty private dwellings. These are, for the most part, half overturned. The same is true of the serais or chateau proper, some rooms of which are currently used as cattle stables. The divan room was adorned with several monolithic columns of gray granite, raised to some ancient monument. Near there, an oualy still standing with its white dome and its minaret is dedicated to Neby Chema'oun es-Safa. A beautiful cistern adjoins it. Some Métualis families have taken up residence in the midst of these ruins.In 1881, the PEF's Survey of Western Palestine (SWP) described Kulat Shema as "A modern-built castle, situated on a very high conical and conspicuous hill seen from a distance, and is occupied by about forty Moslems. The ground around is covered with brushwood, and is uncultivated. There are ten cisterns for water. They further noted: "A Saracenic castle, also said to have been built by Dhahr el 'Amr. The walls and flanking towers are now falling to ruin. The place is occupied by about thirty Mohammedans ; it is situated on a very high conical and conspicuous hill, and was no doubt at one time a strong place."

When the French physician, botanist, zoologist and Egyptologist Louis Lortet visited Chamaa around the same time, he could not find any information about the history of the fortress, and likewise it remained obscure until the violent end of the 20th century:

Modern Times 

During the 1982 Lebanon War with Israel and the subsequent occupation by Israel the castle of Chamaa apparently became a military base for the Israel Defense Forces (IDF), which were accused of wrecking the internal structures of the fort. The Daily Star reported:"In order to allow tanks in, they removed its historical main gate, which some say is now the famous gate of the Israeli coastal town of Akka."In late 1997, attacks by Amal and Hezbollah guerillas on Israeli forces and units of the collaborationist militia South Lebanon Army (SLA) in Chamaa were reported. Hence, it may be argued that Chamaa Castle - like Beaufort Castle in Southeastern Lebanon - is one of the few medieval castles that still has had strategic importance in modern wars, at least until the Israeli wihdrawal in 2000.

During Israel's invasion in the July 2006 Lebanon War, 21 civilians from the village of Marwahin, mostly children, were killed just outside of Chamaa in an Israeli Navy strike followed by a helicopter attack on their convoy while they were attempting to evacuate under Israeli orders. UNIFIL medical teams reportedly came under fire during their rescue mission.

In another assault, the citadel of Chamaa was partly destroyed, including its main tower. While the shrine of Shamoun was rehabilitated with support from the Sheikhdom of Qatar, the renovation of the castle began only in 2014, funded by the Italian government.

In July 2007, a French UNIFIL soldier was killed near Chamaa when an unexploded ordnance from the 2006 war blew up as he was trying to clear it.

It is not clear in which year UNIFIL established the Sector West HQ in Chamaa, about 10 kilometres north of the Blue Line. According to Italian military analysts, by 2015 the Italian Armed Forces deployed at their West Sector headquarters Ten. Millevoi in Chamaa a contingent of "approximately 1100 men and women, together with the contingents of other 11 nations for a total military 3500".

The mayor of Chamaa municipality has been Abdel-Qader Safieddine. Safieddine is also the most common name on the epitaphs of the cemetery next to the mausoleum of Shamoun Al Safa.

Gallery

The Shrine ("Maqam") of Shamoun Al Safa

The Castle

References

Bibliography

External links
Chamaa, Localiban
Survey of Western Palestine, Map 3:  IAA, Wikimedia commons 

Populated places in Tyre District
Shia Muslim communities in Lebanon
Tourist attractions in Lebanon
Castles in Lebanon
Castles and fortifications of the Kingdom of Jerusalem
Archaeological sites in Lebanon

Israeli–Lebanese conflict
Lebanon
Lebanon and the United Nations